Robert E. Morin (born January 9, 1953) is an American lawyer and a former Chief Judge of the Superior Court of the District of Columbia.

Early life and education 
Morin was born on January 9, 1953, in Boston, Massachusetts. In 1974, Morin graduated with a degree in sociology from University of Massachusetts and in 1977 with a Juris Doctor degree from Catholic University Law School.

Career  
Morin worked in private practice from 1977-1996.

Morin has been teaching at Georgetown Law Center as an adjunct professor since 1986.

On December 18, 1995, President Bill Clinton nominated Morin to a fifteen-year term as an associate judge of the Superior Court of the District of Columbia to the seat vacated by Curtis E. von Kann. On March 25, 1996, a hearing was held before the Senate Committee on Governmental Affairs. On July 26, 1996, the United States Senate confirmed his nomination by voice vote. He was sworn in on July 30, 1996. In 2011, he was reappointed for another fifteen-year term, expiring in 2026.

On June 16, 2016, following a thorough selection, the Judicial Nomination Commission announced that it has chosen Morin to serve as the next chief judge of the Superior Court of the District of Columbia.

In April 2020, Morin announced that he plans to retire in September.

Personal life 
Morin lives in Washington, D.C. and is married to Martha Tomich. They have two children.

References

1953 births
Living people
20th-century American judges
21st-century American judges
Georgetown University Law Center faculty
Judges of the Superior Court of the District of Columbia
Lawyers from Boston
University of Massachusetts alumni